Chuvash State Drama K. Ivanov's Theater — is a dramatic theater, located in Cheboksary, Chuvash Republic, Russia. The group combines traditional European and national styles.

History 
The Chuvash State Drama Theater was founded in Kazan in 1918 by theater director Ioakim Stepanovič Maksimov-Koškinskij.

In 1920, the theater company moved to Cheboksary and began showing plays of Chuvash playwrights and translations of Russian classics. Performances played in the Chuvash language.

PN Osipov served as theater director from 1927 to 1939. Original art by theater artists grew stronger from year to year. During this period, the theater collaborated with the best Chuvash playwrights, among them F. Pavlov, I. Maximov-Koshkinsky, N. Iseman, M. Trubina, Agachi L., A. Eskhel A. Colgan, J. Ukhsay, V. Alager, L. Rodionov, V. Ukhli, N. Terentiev.

In 1933, the theater was awarded the title of Academic, and in 1959 it received the name of classic poetry Chuvash Ivanov.

In 1947, the theater came GITIS's graduates (Chuvash studio, Tarkhanov's cours).

The theater won the State Prize of the Russian Federation in 2003.

Theatre today 
Now the theater performs works by foreign playwrights: D.Marotta and B.Randone, Zh.Anuya; Russian - Ostrovsky, Alexander Pushkin, Roshchina, V.Rozova, S. Prokopieva and Tokmakova A. Larevo; Chuvash - N.Sidorova, N. Ugarina A. Chebanova, G.Medvedeva.

Actors and actresses 

Kuz’mina, Vera Kuz’minična
Jakovleva, Nina Mihajlovna
Kirillova, Nadežda Mefod’evna
Andreev, Arkadij Alekseevič
Jakovlev, Valerij Nikolaevič
Ver’jalova, Irina Vasil’evna
Demidov, Aleksandr Oskarovič
Dimitriev, Arsentij Valerianovič
Grigor’eva, Nina Il’inična
Zubkova, Nadežda Alekseevna

Literature

See also
 Chuvash State Opera and Ballet Theater
 Chuvash State Puppet Theater
 Chuvash State Symphony Capella
 Chuvash state youth theater of Michael Sespel

References

External links
 Official site
 History of the Chuvash State Drama Theater
 Юрий Яковлев: Театр Валерия Яковлева опередил театр Виктора Петрова

Buildings and structures in Chuvashia
Cheboksary
Theatres in Chuvashia
Arts organizations established in 1918
Cultural heritage monuments in Chuvashia
Objects of cultural heritage of Russia of regional significance